The Quezon City Hall is a government building which houses the office of the Mayor of Quezon City located along the Elliptical Road. The Quezon City Council is housed within the adjacent Legislative Wing.

History
The first location of the city hall was at the corner of Aurora Boulevard and Highway 54 (now EDSA), beside Cubao Elementary School. It was then transferred within the grounds now occupied by the Ramon Magsaysay (Cubao) High School sometime in the 1950s during the administration of then Acting Mayor Ponciano Bernardo, who was an engineer appointed to the political post by then-President Manuel Roxas.

In the 1949 master plan for Quezon City, it was planned that the Quezon City Hall would be built at the site currently occupied by the East Avenue Medical Center. The present city hall was constructed from 1964 to 1972 and was completed under the watch of then Mayor Norberto Amoranto.

References

Buildings and structures in Quezon City
City and municipal halls in the Philippines
Buildings and structures completed in 1972
Local government buildings in Metro Manila
20th-century architecture in the Philippines